Cameron Donald Green (born 3 June 1999) is an Australian cricketer who plays for Western Australia and Perth Scorchers as a batting all-rounder. He made his international debut for the Australia national cricket team in December 2020.

Career
Green grew up in Subiaco, Perth and played for the Subiaco-Floreat Cricket Club. He started playing in the 2009–10 season in the under 13s league, when he was 10 years old. His rapid development meant he made his WACA first grade debut at the age of 16. Green earned a rookie contract with the Western Australian Cricket Association (WACA) ahead of the 2016/17 Sheffield Shield season, largely thanks to averaging 82 runs per innings and taking 20 wickets in eight games in the under 19s national league.

Green made his List A debut for Cricket Australia XI against Pakistan during their tour of Australia on 10 January 2017. He made his first-class debut for Western Australia in the 2016–17 Sheffield Shield season on 10 February 2017. He took 5/24 in the first innings to become the youngest player to take a five-wicket haul in the Sheffield Shield. He made his Twenty20 debut for the Perth Scorchers in the 2018–19 Big Bash League season on 13 January 2019.

Originally a bowling all-rounder, Green began focusing on improving his batting following a series of injuries. His breakthrough performance being 87* and 121* against Queensland in the 2019–20 Sheffield Shield season.

In October 2020, Green was named in Australia's squad for the limited overs matches against India. In November 2020, he was also named in Australia's Test squad for the matches against India. Green made his One Day International (ODI) debut for Australia against India on 2 December 2020. In a warm-up match before the Test series, Green scored a century for Australia A. He made his Test debut for Australia on 17 December 2020, against India.

In March 2021, Green scored his maiden double century in first-class cricket, with 251 runs for Western Australia against Queensland in the 2020–21 Sheffield Shield season. In February 2022, Green was named in Australia's Twenty20 International (T20I) squad for their tour of Pakistan. He made his T20I debut on 5 April 2022, for Australia against Pakistan. In August 2022, he took his first ODI five-wicket haul, against Zimbabwe in Townsville. In the first ODI against New Zealand in Cairns, he was named player of the match after making 89 not out in a difficult run chase. In the T20I Series against India, Green scored two half-centuries.

In October 2022, Green was added to the Australian squad for the 2022 T20 World Cup as an injury replacement for Josh Inglis.

In December 2022, Green picked his maiden five-wicket haul in Test cricket while bowling in the first innings of Boxing Day Test of South Africa tour of Australia at Melbourne Cricket Ground.

In the IPL 2023 auction, Green was bought by the Mumbai Indians for INR 17.5 crore (approximately $3.15 million AUD), making him the second most expensive overseas player in IPL auction history and most expensive Australian player.

In the fourth Test in Ahmedabad of the 2023 Border-Gavaskar Trophy, Green scored his maiden Test century (114).

References

External links
 

1999 births
Living people
Australian cricketers
Australia One Day International cricketers
Cricket Australia XI cricketers
Place of birth missing (living people)
Western Australia cricketers
Perth Scorchers cricketers
Australia Test cricketers
Australia Twenty20 International cricketers
People educated at Scotch College, Perth